Foreign exchange service may refer to:
Foreign exchange service (finance)
Foreign exchange service (telecommunications)